Closeness may refer to:
 closeness (mathematics) 
 closeness (graph theory), the shortest path between one vertex and another vertex
 the personal distance between two people in proxemics
 Social connectedness
Closeness (album), a 1976 album by Charlie Haden
Closeness (film), a 2017 Russian film